PPA may refer to:

Biomedical
 Palpatio per anum, Latin medical term for a rectal examination
 Parahippocampal place area located within the parahippocampal gyrus
 Phenylpropanolamine
 Primary progressive aphasia

Organizations
 Pakistan Pharmacists Association
 Palau Pacific Airways
 , the Algerian People's Party in French
 Paraguayan People's Army, a group considered a terrorist organization by the Paraguayan state
 Philadelphia Parking Authority, a parking agency in Philadelphia, PA, USA
 Philippine Ports Authority
 The stock symbol of Piraeus Port Authority
 Pictorial Photographers of America, founded by Clarence Hudson White with several others in 1916
 Poker Players Alliance, a USA advocacy/lobbying group
 Popski's Private Army, a small World War II Special Forces unit of the British 8th Army
 Pre-School Playgroups Association, UK organization later named the Pre-school Learning Alliance
 Professional Pickleball Association
 Professional Photographers of America
 Professional Publishers Association
 Professional Putters Association
 Progressive Peoples Alliance, a political party in Nigeria
 People's Party of Arunachal, a regional political party in the Indian state of Arunachal Pradesh

Technology
 Pay-per-action
 Personal Package Archive, an Ubuntu Linux software repository for managing source packages
 Polyphthalamide, semi-crystalline high-temperature plastic in the Nylon family
 Power purchase agreement, a contract for the purchase of electrical energy
Polyphosphoric acid

Other
 Pension Protection Act of 2006, U.S. federal law
 Point pattern analysis
 Pollution Prevention Act of 1990, U.S. federal law
 PPA (complexity), a class of search problems
 Purchase price allocation
 Participatory poverty assessment
 Philadelphia Parking Authority 
 Provisional application, commonly known as a 'provisional patent application'
 Planning, preparation and assessment, an allocation given to teaching professionals as part of their timetable